Käbelicksee is a lake in the Mecklenburgische Seenplatte district in Mecklenburg-Vorpommern, Germany.

It is part of the Müritz National Park. At an elevation of 62.4 m, its surface area is 2.64 km².

External links 

 

Lakes of Mecklenburg-Western Pomerania